The Living God: Medicine and The Ancient Meetei Civilization is a 2015 English language short documentary film written and directed by Prakas Aheibam. It is based on the medicine and the ancient Meitei civilization (ancient Kangleipak).

This documentary film was produced by a resourceless staff who were deeply conscious and appreciated of ancient forgotten human values for the revival. It initiates the information about unknown things and unsuspected resources of ancient civilizations and the hugely deep and materialistic modern times casting their shadow upon them. It shows the undiscovered knowledge as well as the unending ways and resources of the universe known to man only through deeply spiritual and considering great forces.

Background 
Meetei Civilization (Ancient Kangleipak), in the present day Northeast India bordering Myanmar (Burma), is a civilization still unknown to most of the world. Meitei script, its ancient script is the representation of the well developed nature of its civilization. The form, structure and phonology of the ancient Meitei writing system show the understanding of human physiology. The ancient Puyas record their ancient knowledge on many subjects including astrology, astronomy, genetics, human physiology, medicine, oracles (predictions), abiogenesis (origin of life), cosmogony (study of the origin of the universe), and the secrets of life and death. The ancient Meitei writings also deal with the relationship between Lai (Meitei term for God) and human beings. Even in present day times, the mixed relationship between the two entities are celebrated in the Lai Haraoba (festivals of Gods). Standing against the burning of Puyas (Puya Mei Thaba), many of these ancient writings still survive even today. The medicine of this ancient civilization is considered as an inheritance from the Lai (Meitei term for God). The descendent people of the ancient civilization still continue to cure as well as treat many modern diseases and illnesses with the healing power of the ancient medicine.

Prakas Aheibam, the director of the movie, has interests of antiques, artifacts and folktales since his childhood. Like many people of his age, he grew up hearing about the historic golden era of Meitei culture. So, he wished for studying for the then unknown world of Meetei Civilization (Ancient Kangleipak). In the year 2006, he saw a miraculous healing effect of the ancient Meitei medical science. It was when his father was suffering from a disease. So, he got more curious to learn about ancient Meitei culture and society. At the same time, one of his friends introduced him to the illustrated human physiology that formed the structure and phonology of revived ancient Meitei script. For almost a decade, Prakas Aheibam dedicated to study for the different aspects of the ancient Meetei Civilization (Ancient Kangleipak).

International receptions 
The movie received official entries in many international film festivals across the world. These include:

Accolades 
The "The Living God: Medicine and The Ancient Meetei Civilization" won multiple awards and honours from many international film festivals held across the globe. It won the "Best Foreign Short Documentary" and the "Best Original Music" at the "Los Angeles Independent Film Festival" for the month of April. Its screening and awarding was held on 9 May 2015 in Los Angeles. This documentary also got official selection for the "Los Angeles CineFest" in the same year.

In the International Film Festival for Peace, Inspiration, and Equality 2015, "The Living God: Medicine and The Ancient Meetei Civilization" won two awards. It won the "Humanitarian Award" and the "Merit Award". In the same festival, it was also designated as the "Finalists Most Favorite Film 2015".

In the "Hollywood International Independent Documentary Awards 2016", the "The Living God: Medicine and The Ancient Meetei Civilization" won the Best Foreign Documentary (Short) Award.

See also 
 Daughters of the Polo God
 My Japanese Niece

References

External links 
 

Cinema of Manipur
English-language Indian films
Meitei culture
Meitei folklore in popular culture
Meitei script
Northeast Indian films
2015 films
2015 short documentary films
Indian short documentary films
2010s English-language films